Miguel Santín del Castillo (1830–1880) was President of El Salvador from 7 February 1858 to 7 June 1858, and again from 18 September 1858 to 19 January 1859. An army officer himself, he founded the Military Academy of San Salvador. At age 28, he was the youngest ever president of El Salvador.

References

Presidents of El Salvador
19th-century politicians
1830 births
1880 deaths